Cerithium coralium is a species of sea snail, a marine gastropod mollusk in the family Cerithiidae.

Description

Distribution
The distribution of Cerithium coralium includes the Indo-West Pacific.
 Philippines
 Indonesia
 Guam

References

Cerithiidae
Gastropods described in 1841